Ivan Yarmysh (15 February 1925 – 3 April 1990) was a Ukrainian racewalker who competed for the Soviet Union in the 1952 Summer Olympics.

References

1925 births
1990 deaths
Ukrainian male racewalkers
Olympic athletes of the Soviet Union
Athletes (track and field) at the 1952 Summer Olympics
Soviet male racewalkers